The 1888 Williams Ephs football team represented the Williams College as a member of the Eastern Intercollegiate Football Association (EIFA) during the 1888 college football season. Williams compiled an overall record of 4–4 with a mark of 3–1 in EIFA play.

Schedule

References

Williams
Williams Ephs football seasons
Williams Ephs football